Ray Lazdins is a retired discus thrower from Canada, who represented his native country twice at the Summer Olympics, starting in 1988 (Seoul, South Korea). He is a nine-time national champion in the discus throw.

Achievements

References
 Canadian Olympic Committee

Living people
Canadian male discus throwers
Athletes (track and field) at the 1986 Commonwealth Games
Athletes (track and field) at the 1987 Pan American Games
Athletes (track and field) at the 1988 Summer Olympics
Athletes (track and field) at the 1992 Summer Olympics
Olympic track and field athletes of Canada
Commonwealth Games gold medallists for Canada
Commonwealth Games medallists in athletics
Pan American Games track and field athletes for Canada
Year of birth missing (living people)
Medallists at the 1986 Commonwealth Games
Athletes (track and field) at the 1990 Commonwealth Games
Athletes (track and field) at the 1994 Commonwealth Games